The Czech Republic national rugby league team was established to broaden the skills of the rugby union team. The team has competed in a number of competitions and hosted the Slavic Cup in 2006.

History
The Czech Association of Rugby League (CZARL) began life in early 2006, under the guidance of former Czech rugby union international Milan Mrtýnek and Englishman Iain Sellers.

The squad's first training session, in February 2006, was held in an indoor basketball hall because of an extremely fierce Czech winter. From these modest beginnings, the Czech Republic team, with support from the Rugby League European Federation, struggled to play four full games in their debut season.

Perhaps inevitably, given the unfamiliarity of the game, the Czech Republic lost all four matches, and the margins of defeat were not narrow. The Czechs played their first two games against the touring British Student Pioneers team. A 29–2 loss in Prague was followed by a less encouraging 34–2 defeat in Olomouc.

This was followed by the first away trip to Rotterdam to face the Netherlands Tasman team, where the newcomers were narrowly defeated 34–28. In their final game of the season, also in Prague, the Czechs were beaten 36–28 by Serbia, in the inaugural "Slavic Cup" match between the two countries.

In 2007 The Czech Republic played in the European Shield tournament against the Germany and Serbia. This saw them travel to Belgrade to play Serbia and Germany travelled to Prague. Both games were lost. The Serbia game doubled again as a Slavic Cup match. In 2008 the Czech Republic team once again competed in the European Shield along with Italy and Germany, with a domestic competition in u16, u18 and Senior level.

In 2011, the Czech Rugby League Association was admitted to affiliate membership of the Rugby League European Federation after reforming its governance.

Current squad
The Czech Republic national team for the 2021 Men's Rugby League World Cup qualifying match against  on June 16, 2018.

National team results 
The following is a summary of tournaments and results for the Czech Republic National Rugby League Team.

European Championship

2006

The year 2006 saw the inaugural entrance of the Czech Republic Rugby League team. Playing two games against the Dutch team Netherlands Tasman. This was a close and competitive match against a team that is competing for a place in the 2008 Rugby League World Cup. The Czechs eventually going down by a converted try 34–28. Also in 2006 was the establishing of the annual Slavic Cup tournament, contested by the Czechs and Serbia. Serbia were the inaugural winners 38–26 in what was also a close match.

OTHER
Netherlands Tasman 34–28 Czech Republic  – Rotterdam, Netherlands – (4 August 2006)

SLAVIC CUP
Czech Republic 26–38 Serbia  – Prague, Czech Republic – (12 August 2006)

In all, the first year of international competition for the Czechs was deemed a success.

2007
In 2007 the Czechs entered the European Shield tri-nations tournament. This was the successor to the central development tournament the previous year that had Germany, Austria and Estonia. The European Shield was part of a multi level (tier) structure of tournaments in which teams will be promoted and relegated. The Czechs had to face the Serbians and Germans in this year's tournament and were looking to get some revenge on the Serbian team from the previous year's loss. The Serbian game would also double as the Slavic Cup game.

Alas this was not to be the Czech's year. Despite some fantastic play in offence in both games the battle hardened Serbians, who had just come off a World Cup campaign, and Germans proved a bit too strong. Still it showed that the seeds in the Czech Republic had taken hold and they will have a good core of young players to call upon in the coming years. The first game against the Germans was on home soil and Germany just having had a stinging loss to the Serbs were out to make amends and some valuable points. The Czechs after having a strong lead in the first half went into the half down by 6 points. In the second half the Germans experience came through and they ran away with the win 44–22. The next match was in Belgrade against the Serbians who showed why they were in World Cup contention. With an early try to the Czechs, the Serbians then muscled up in defence and moved the ball in attack to use their advantage. With the win secured the Serbians not only took away the European Shield but also the Slavic Cup.

EUROPEAN SHIELD
 Czech Republic 22–44 Germany  – Prague, Czech Republic – (4 August 2007)
 Serbia 56–16 Czech Republic – Belgrade, Serbia – (18 August 2007)

 Other European Shield game: Germany 6-38 Serbia – Heidelberg, Germany – (7 July 2007)

SLAVIC CUP

 Serbia 56–16 Czech Republic – Belgrade, Serbia – (18 August 2007)

2008
The 2008 European Shield Tri Series once again featured the Czech Republic along with Germany and newcomers Italy. Last year's winners, Serbia, had been promoted into the European Med Cup with Lebanon and Russia.

The Czech Republic were looking to go two steps better this year, to get a maiden win in international competition and one over local international derby rivals Germany. With the advent of regular touring teams to Prague and Beroun and also a junior structure there was much confidence in the Czechs becoming a local force to be reckoned with this year and the coming years.

EUROPEAN SHIELD
 Italy 58–26 Germany – Padova, Italy – (13 June 2008)
 Czech Rep. 18–38 Italy – Prague, Czech Republic – (12 July 2008)
 Germany 62–20 Czech Republic – Karlsruhe, Germany – (2 August 2008)

2009
The Czech Rugby League Association announced a 20-man squad and travelling party selected from four of the sides that competed in the inaugural domestic Championship to form a 'Czech President's XIII' to play a European Tour. The tour commenced with a game against Catalonia, then two European Shield matches against Germany at home in Olomouc on 4 July and in Padova against Italy a week later.

The first match took place at the Olympic Stadium in Barcelona as a curtain raiser to the engage Super League Round 17 clash between Catalans Dragons and Warrington Wolves, which attracted a crowd of 18,150. Over 3,000 watched the international at kick-off, and the crowd grew steadily through the game.

The first match of the 2009 European Shield was played between Germany and the Czech Republic in Olomouc.  Before a home crowd, the Czech team came away with their first international win. They subsequently lost to eventual champions Italy, but the win over Germany was enough to earn second place in the tournament.

EUROPEAN SHIELD
 Czech Rep 30–4 Germany – Olomouc, Czech Republic – (4 July 2009)
 Italy 38–8 Czech Republic – Padova, Italy – (11 July 2009)
 Germany 30–42 Italy – Hurth, Germany – (18 July 2009)

2010
The first match of the 2010 European Shield West was played between the Czech Republic and Serbia in Prague with a win for Serbia 4–56. In July, the CZRLA announced that Andrew Mulhall would be the new national team coach, before the friendly match that Czech Republic lost with Catalonia 16–66. The last match was against Germany in Hochspeyer with another loss.

EUROPEAN SHIELD – West
 Czech Republic 4–56 Serbia – Prague, Czech Republic – (26 June 2010)
 Serbia 40–14 Germany – Belgrade, Serbia – (3 July 2010)
 Germany 96–0 Czech Rep. – Hochspeyer, Germany – (17 July 2010)

2011
In 2011 the Czech Republic national rugby league team participated in the Rugby League European Bowl against Hungary. The tournament featured a one off fixture between the two nations on 23 July in Budapest, Hungary.

 Czech Republic 38–16 Hungary XIII – Budapest, Hungary – (23 July 2011)

Tour matches
There have been several touring sides that have been on development tours to the Czech Republic.

2006
 Czech Republic XIII 08–29 British Students – Prague, Czech Republic – (9 July 2006)
 Czech Republic XIII 22–34 British Students – Olomouc, Czech Republic – (16 July 2006)

2007
 Czech Republic XIII 18–64 Shaw Cross Sharks – Prague, Czech Republic – (27 April 2007)
 Czech Republic XIII 10–22 Crigglestone All Blacks – Olomouc, Czech Republic – (5 May 2007)
 Czech Republic XIII 10–68 British Police – Beroun, Czech Republic – (23 May 2007)

2008
 TBA

See also

 Rugby league in the Czech Republic

References

External links
 http://www.rugbyleague.cz/
 http://www.czechrugbyleague.com/

National rugby league team
National rugby league teams
National sports teams of the Czech Republic